Jake MacDonald (1949 – January 30, 2020) was a Canadian author. MacDonald produced eight books and several hundred articles in Canadian magazines.

Born in Winnipeg, Manitoba, MacDonald was an alumnus of St. Paul's High School, Winnipeg, Class of 1967. MacDonald received a BA in English from the University of Manitoba in 1971. After graduation, MacDonald was a carpenter and fishing guide before becoming a full-time writer.

Over twenty-five years he produced ten books of both fiction and non-fiction, numerous short-stories and about two hundred stories for many of Canada's leading publications, including The Globe and Mail, Outdoor Canada, Canadian Geographic, Maclean's, Cottage Life, Canadian Business and The Walrus. His writing netted over twenty-five awards. The memoir Houseboat Chronicles: Notes from a Life in Shield Country won three awards across the country, including the Pearson Writers' Trust Prize for Nonfiction in 2002.

His 1997 young adult novel Juliana and the Medicine Fish was made into a feature film in 2015. In 2019, his first play The Cottage was staged at Royal Manitoba Theatre Centre's John Hirsch Mainstage. Also in 2019, MacDonald won the Winnipeg Arts Council "Making a Mark Award."

MacDonald died on January 30, 2020, after a fall in a home that he was building in Puerto Vallarta. He was 70.

Works
Indian River - 1981
The Bridge Out of Town - 1986
Two Tickets to Paradise - 1990
Raised by the River - 1992
Juliana and the Medicine Fish - 1997
The Lake: An Illustrated History of Manitobans' Cottage Country - 2001
Houseboat Chronicles: Notes from a Life in Shield Country - 2002
With the Boys: Field Notes on Being a Guy - 2005
Grizzlyville: Adventures in Bear Country - 2009
Casting Quiet Waters: Reflections on Life and Fishing (edited) - 2014

References

External links
 Official website
 Jake Macdonald fonds, University of Manitoba Archives & Special Collections
 Manitoba Historical Society, Memorable Manitobans: Jake MacDonald (1949-2020)

1949 births
2020 deaths
Canadian male novelists
Writers from Winnipeg
Canadian memoirists
University of Manitoba alumni
20th-century Canadian novelists
20th-century Canadian male writers
Canadian male non-fiction writers
Accidental deaths from falls
Accidental deaths in Mexico